Erica De Matteis (born 20 April 1994 in Rome, Lazio) is an Italian beauty pageant titleholder who was crowned Miss Universo Italia 2018. She represented Italy at the Miss Universe 2018 pageant in Bangkok, Thailand.

Life and career
De Matteis was born and raised in Rome, Lazio. She is graduating in the Faculty of Sciences of Education and loves working with children. She is a singer and musician, from the age of 14 he started working as a model for clothing brands.

Pageantry

Miss World Italy 2015
De Matteis finished as the 2nd Runner-up at Miss World Italy 2015 represented Lazio. Meanwhile, the official winner was Greta Galassi from Trentino-Alto Adige  crowned as the 2015 winner and competed at Miss World 2015 in Sanya, China where she did not place in the top 20.

Miss Universo Italia 2018
De Matteis was crowned as Miss Universo Italia 2018 represented Lazio. She succeeded outgoing by Miss Universo Italia 2017 Maria Polverino.

Miss Universe 2018
As the official representative of her country to the 2018 Miss Universe pageant held in Bangkok, Thailand on 17 December 2018, where she failed among the top 20 semifinalist.

References

External links 

Sito ufficiale di Miss Universo Italia

1994 births
Living people
Miss Universe 2018 contestants
Italian beauty pageant winners
Models from Rome